The following is a list of companies based in Utah.

Companies based in Utah

Companies formerly based in Utah

 
Utah
Companies